Safiya Hussaini Tungar Tudu (born 1967) is a Nigerian woman condemned  to death for adultery in 2002. She gave birth to a child as a single woman in Sokoto, a Nigerian state under Sharia law. She was sentenced to be stoned, but was acquitted of all charges in March 2002 after a retrial.

Background
Hussaini was sentenced to death by stoning in October 2001 for allegedly having a child with a married neighbour. She had the child after her divorce. Hussaini claimed that she was the victim of repeated rape by a man, whom the Sharia court found not guilty due to lack of evidence. During the trial, Hussaini had no legal representation and was not informed of her legal rights. The Sokoto court dismissed her testimony and convicted her on 12 October 2001.

The verdict was widely condemned and international campaigns and petitions to release her were launched. Halima Abdullahi, director of Help Eliminate  Loneliness and Poverty (HELP), a non-governmental organisation, also criticized the verdict. In a statement she said the verdict was a "thorough embarrassment” to the majority of Nigerian Muslims. The group argued that the judgment was wrong because Hussaini was accused of adultery instead of fornication, since she was a divorcee. Also, the four witnesses stipulated by the Islamic law were not available at the trial. Halima claimed that the verdict was passed because Hussaini came from an Underprivileged class. While describing the verdict as “gender discrimination of the highest order,” the group called on Governor Attahiru Bafarawa to intervene to save Hussaini’s life.

Hussaini appealed, her lawyers arguing that Hussaini's former husband was the father of her one-year-old daughter Adama and that the village woman had made her original statement under duress. Further they argued that the alleged act of adultery had taken place before sharia law was implemented in the state. Full Sharia law was established in Sokoto in June 2000, a month after baby Adama was conceived. She was defended by Nigerian human rights lawyer Hauwa Ibrahim.

Hussaini also told the reporter Okorie Uguru that her pregnancy was the result of a rape.

Hussaini won her appeal on March 25, 2002 and the case was dismissed. The Appeal Court in Sokoto found that the death sentence, originally handed down by an Islamic Sharia court in October, had been baseless. The court ruled that the adultery provisions of Sokoto's Sharia law could not be used against Hussaini, as the alleged adultery must have taken place before the introduction of Sharia law in Sokoto moreover pregnancy as evidence was not enough.

Hussaini's plight was later recorded in the book, Safiya Hussaini Tungar Tudu: I, Safiya (2004).

18 years later, Hussaini said she'd forgiven her tormentors.

See also
Amina Lawal
Hauwa Ibrahim
Sharia in Nigeria

References

External links
 Nigerian Woman Condemned to Death by Stoning Is Acquitted - New York Times (2002-3-26)
 Nigeria: warning over Sharia courts after Safiya Hussaini Acquittal Amnesty International, 25 March 2002.
 Nigerian Woman Avoids Stoning Death
 Muslim woman spared death by stoning in Nigeria
 Safiya Hussaini case
 Safiya Hussaini Tungar-Tudu sits in a jail cell in Nigeria facing a death sentence

Victims of human rights abuses
Nigerian prisoners sentenced to death
Prisoners sentenced to death by Nigeria
Living people
1967 births
Women's rights in Nigeria
Hausa people
Violence against women in Nigeria